Louis Friedsell (born 1863 or 1865, Yekaterinoslav, Ukraine; died 25 June 1923, New York, United States) was a conductor and composer for the Yiddish theatre.
He has written the music for about 150 plays and operettas (partly by himself, partly with other music writers).
A large number of his songs were written for historical operettas and comedies.  As a conductor he made at least eleven recordings for the United Hebrew Disc and Cylinder Company.

References

External links 
 Literature by and about Louis Friedsell in the German National Library catalogue
 Toire Chipe Masim Toivim at YouTube

1863 births
1865 births
1923 deaths
Pioneer recording artists